In combinatorial mathematics, the Stirling transform of a sequence { an : n = 1, 2, 3, ... } of numbers is the sequence { bn : n = 1, 2, 3, ... } given by

where  is the Stirling number of the second kind, also denoted S(n,k) (with a capital S), which is the number of partitions of a set of size n into k parts.

The inverse transform is

where s(n,k) (with a lower-case s) is a Stirling number of the first kind.

Berstein and Sloane (cited below) state "If an is the number of objects in some class with points labeled 1, 2, ..., n (with all labels distinct, i.e. ordinary labeled structures), then bn is the number of objects with points labeled 1, 2, ..., n (with repetitions allowed)."

If

is a formal power series, and

with an and bn as above, then

Likewise, the inverse transform leads to the generating function identity

See also
 Binomial transform
 Generating function transformation
 List of factorial and binomial topics

References

 .
 Khristo N. Boyadzhiev, Notes on the Binomial Transform, Theory and Table, with Appendix on the Stirling Transform (2018), World Scientific.

Factorial and binomial topics
Transforms